Harlan L. Watson is an American congressional staffer on the House Science, Space and Technology Committee.

He holds "a B.A. in Physics from Western Illinois University, a Ph.D. in Physics from Iowa State University, and an M.A. in Economics from Georgetown University."

Posts he has held include:
chairman of the Policy and Implementation Committee of the Asia-Pacific Partnership on Clean Development and Climate
Senior Climate Negotiator and Special Representative in the State Department
staff member of the House of Representatives' Committee on Science
Science Advisor to the Secretary of the Interior
Deputy Assistant and Principal Deputy Secretary of Interior for Water and Science
staff member of the United States Senate Subcommittee on Energy, Nuclear Proliferation, and Federal Services

On February 6, 2001, a fax was sent from Exxon Mobil to the Council on Environmental Quality, a White House office. The fax asked that Watson be made "'available to work with the team' of Americans attending international climate change meetings." Later in 2001, he was appointed by the George W. Bush administration as Special Envoy to the United Nations Framework Convention on Climate Change, for which he held the rank of ambassador. As the chief negotiator representing the United States at the December 2005 conference in Montréal, Watson walked out of a meeting, reportedly over a disagreement about the title of a document.

References

External links
USA Today stories about Harlan Watson

Living people
Western Illinois University alumni
Iowa State University alumni
Georgetown University Graduate School of Arts and Sciences alumni
Year of birth missing (living people)